Irina Nikolayevna Yegorova (born 8 April 1940) is a Russian speed skater who competed for the Soviet Union at the 1964 and 1968 Winter Olympics. In 1964 she won the silver medal in the 500 and 1000 m events. Four years later she finished fifth in the 1000 m and ninth in the 500 m contest.

Yegorova became known internationally in 1962–1963, when she skated 500 m and 1000 m in world record times, even though her records were not officially recognised. In 1963 she won a silver medal in the 500 m at the world championships and finished fourth all-around. In 1964, just a week after the Olympics, she won the 500 m at the world championships. She continued dominating sprint events at world all-around championships until 1967, when she won silver in the 500 m, but she never finished within the podium overall. Domestically she won only one title, in 1963; she finished second in 1969, but set a sprint all-around world record in late December.

In 1963 Yegorova graduated from the Ivanovo Textile Institute, where she then worked until 1964. Between 1964 and 1967 she was employed at a penal colony nearby, and after that coached speed skating in Ivanovo and Moscow. From 1989 to 2004 she worked as a school teacher in Ivanovo, and later resumed her coaching activities. In 1995 she won the national 500 m title in the masters division.

Yegorova was married, but her husband died by 2011; she has a son.

Personal bests:
500 m – 45.0 (1968)
 1000 m – 1:31.2 (1970)
 1500 m – 2:24.6 (1962)
 3000 m – 5:10.8 (1969)

References

1940 births
Living people
Medalists at the 1964 Winter Olympics
Olympic medalists in speed skating
Olympic silver medalists for the Soviet Union
Olympic speed skaters of the Soviet Union
Russian female speed skaters
Soviet female speed skaters
Speed skaters at the 1964 Winter Olympics
Speed skaters at the 1968 Winter Olympics
Honoured Masters of Sport of the USSR
Sportspeople from Ivanovo